This is a list of college women's soccer coaches with 300 wins. Anson Dorrance of North Carolina is the all-time leader in both wins and winning percentage with a record of 826–70–38.

College women's soccer coaches with 300 wins

Key

Coaches
Unless otherwise noted, statistics are correct through the end of the 2020 season.

See also
National Soccer Coaches Association of America

References

Soccer, Women's
 
Soccer